iBuy was a British satellite-based home shopping channel.

Created & launched on 18 April 2005, by Andy Sheldon, who was one of George Spitaliotis's senior management figures at Auction World.tv and also created their sister channel Chase-It.tv.

iBuy launched from the ex-AuctionWorld studio at Teddington Studios, Broom Road, Teddington. It was later relocated in early 2006, to Studio 1, Unit 1A, Hogarth Business Park, Burlington Lane, Chiswick, London. iBuy operates as a falling price auction channel, similar to that of the 'original' auction shopping channel idea used by bid TV, price-drop TV, and airs between 9:00 AM and 12:00 PM, 7 days a week on Sky. Towards the end of 2006, was also broadcast between 9:00 AM–12:00 PM on Freeview, as part of Five US.

iBuy2  broadcast 7 days a week on Sky 632, also broadcasting live falling price auctions from a separate studio, which was the home of the defunct HSN owned quiz channel Quiz TV. iBuy2 ended on 18 February 2007, with the channel now only showing pre-recorded iBuy Choice.

iBuy Unique was broadcast every day during iBuy's off-air hours, on Sky 631 from 12:00 PM midnight to 9:00 AM and on Sky 632 from 12:00 PM midnight to 3:00 PM, and then from 6:00 PM onwards. iBuy Unique operated on the similar "original" channel idea of the HSN financed Bid2Win where the 'Lowest Unique Bid' auction, where bidders are invited to place a bid by phone, by SMS text message or online at www.ibuyunique.tv. However, this is an auction with a difference, as only one person can win.  For example, if two bids are placed, at 1:00 PM and 2:00 PM, 1:00 PM is the currently the lowest unique bid, however if someone else comes in with a bid of 1:00 PM, 1:00 PM is no longer a valid bid, and therefore 2:00 PM is now the lowest unique bid.

On iBuy, viewers are invited to bid in 'Freefall' auctions by picking up their landline phone or mobile phone and dialling the number on screen, or logging onto the iBuy website at www.ibuy.tv and bidding online.  The price of the item up for auction falls until all the quantity is sold, and at the end of the auction (when the quantity is sold out,) everyone pays the lowest price.

iBuy was also the subject of the BBC Three Welcome To My World documentary "Porno, Preachers and Peadlers" alongside Television X, Girl Fever and Revelation TV.

Closure 

Following speculation, it has been reported in St. Petersburg (Florida) Times that the parent company of iBuy, HSN are to close the troubled channel sometime in May 2007, and 85 jobs will be lost.

The possible reasons for the channel's closure are cited to be connected to financial difficulties at the channel, due to their failure to successfully break into a market already dominated by shopping channels such as QVC UK, The sit-up Ltd channels (bid TV, price-drop TV, speed auction TV), Ideal World and Gems TV. It has also been suggested, that there is a growing number of customer complaints over products, and mounting controversy over the channel allegedly selling fake products, in particular Tiffany.

On 18 March 2007, Senior Presenter Adam Freeman, revealed while on air, that it was to be his final shift. It was also revealed, that unlike many of the other staff at iBuy, he wasn't to be out of a job. As like the previous iBuy Head of Broadcasting, Andy Sheldon, Freeman will in fact be moving over to parent company HSN for employment in the USA.

On 27 March 2007, it was officially announced on the iBuy website that the channel has now ceased live broadcasting. In its slots, iBuy will be offering a variety of programming over the coming weeks, which include pre-recorded iBuy Unique, and Rye by Post Collectibles.

Criticism

Possible links to Auction World.tv 

iBuy was launched shortly after the collapse of Auction World.tv, and features many Auction World similarities namely in channel ideas, products, contacts and employees.

 Andy Sheldon: Head of Production at AW - now involved at iBuy, as the Head of Broadcasting. And has recently been promoted to Senior Vice President of Broadcasting, at the parent company HSN in the USA.
 Tim Cochran: Company Director at AW - now involved at iBuy
 Sandy Sandcaster: Operations Director and George Spitaliotis' business partner at AW - now involved at iBuy
 Simon Stedman: Customer Services manager at AW - now involved at iBuy

iBuy also launched with most of the production, and floor staff from Auction World, as well as initially using AW's Studio, Production Office & Warehouse at Teddington.

However, although iBuy is primarily run on a daily basis in the UK, by the ex-workforce of Auction World.tv, iBuy is not from the same company that created Auction World.tv. It is financed and owned by US Home Shopping Company HSN, whose parent company are competitors with the QVC network in the USA.

The Auction World.tv links have stemmed from the channel being set up by Andy Sheldon and Adam Freeman, both long-term friends and ex-Auction World employees. Who after the collapse of Auction World, found new monetary backers, and decided to create iBuy and in doing so, used the redundant auction-world.tv employees, products, channel contacts and studio equipment.

Dropped by NTL 

On 28 August 2006 Britain's biggest digital cable outlet NTL made the decision to drop the iBuy channel from its platform. Prior to termination, iBuy complained to UK regulators that NTL, which owns competitor sit-up Limited, owner of channels bid TV, price-drop TV and speed auction TV, was abusing its dominant position in the cable market. Both the UK Office of Fair Trading and Ofcom declined to take any action due to a ‘lack of resources’ and 'unproven accusations' made by iBuy.

It has also been suggested on a number of media websites, that NTL decided to drop the iBuy shopping channel from its cable platform, due to financial problems at the HSN financed iBuy, although these allegations are unproven.

Connections to Ideal World and OneTV 

In early October 2006, presenter Debbie Flint appeared on the iBuy shopping channel, as a 'guest' host. The same presenter who was directly involved with Paul Lavers & Steve Whatley to create, and present on the British shopping channel Ideal World.

Flint and Lavers would later join-up with mutual friend Paul Price, to present on the British shopping channel OneTV. Paul Lavers presented for only a short time on OneTV, before he later joined iBuy (again, only for a few months) in 2005. Debbie Flint although continued to present, and be involved with OneTV, right up until the major problems reared their head which eventually forced the channel to close in disgrace.

OneTV had its broadcast licence revoked by Ofcom, after it failed to pay its fee. The OneTV channel had previously been under investigation from the Advertising Standards Authority (ASA) after a number of viewers complained that orders had not been fulfilled, and refunds equalling to thousands of pounds had not been returned.

Presenters 

 Adam Freeman
 Darren Simons
 John Hammond
 Craig Rowe
 Alex Knowles
 Mike Mason
 Mark Stuart
 Paul Lavers
 Greg Scott
 Elisa Portelli
 Gemma Scott
 Caroline Artus
 Victoria Showers
 Fayon Cottrell
 Anoushka Williams
 Genevieve Mullen
 Georgina Burnett
 Zilpah Hartley
 Polly Parsons
 Laura Hamilton
 Debbie Flint
 Roshanth Gardiarachchi

References

External links 
 Former website

Shopping networks in the United Kingdom
Defunct television channels in the United Kingdom
IAC (company)